Scott Duncan may refer to:
Scott Duncan (footballer) (1888–1975), Scottish footballer and manager
Scott Duncan (businessman) (born 1983), American billionaire
Scott Duncan (referee), English football referee
Scottie Duncan, American baseball player

See also